Exoernestia is a genus of parasitic flies in the family Tachinidae. There are at least two described species in Exoernestia.

Species
These two species belong to the genus Exoernestia:
 Exoernestia lluyi Townsend, 1929
 Exoernestia uruhuasi Townsend, 1927

References

Further reading

 
 
 
 

Tachinidae
Articles created by Qbugbot